Jure Lalić (born February 8, 1986) is a Croatian professional basketball player who plays for Kaposvár of the Hungarian League.

References

External links
 ABA League Profile
 Euroleague Profile
 FIBA Profile

1986 births
Living people
ABA League players
Basket Zielona Góra players
Croatian men's basketball players
KK Cibona players
Kaposvári KK players
KK Krka players
KK MZT Skopje players
KK Olimpija players
KK Zadar players
PBC Academic players
Sportspeople from Makarska
Spirou Charleroi players
Mediterranean Games gold medalists for Croatia
Mediterranean Games medalists in basketball
Competitors at the 2009 Mediterranean Games
Centers (basketball)